The Twenty-Third Canadian Ministry was the cabinet chaired by Prime Minister John Turner.  It governed Canada from 30 June 1984 to 17 September 1984, including only the last nine days of the 32nd Canadian Parliament.  The government was formed by the Liberal Party of Canada.

Ministers

References

Succession

23
Ministries of Elizabeth II
1984 establishments in Canada
1984 disestablishments in Canada
Cabinets established in 1984
Cabinets disestablished in 1984